Tingon is a peninsula in the north-west of Northmavine, Shetland. It is delineated on the east by Ronas Voe, and on the west by Hamnavoe. It is designated as a Ramsar site, a Special Protection Area, a Special Area of Conservation and a Site of Special Scientific Interest. It is also the collective name of a group of settlements on the peninsula, which were nearly all evicted as part of the Highland Clearances.

History 
At its peak, Tingon had a number of crofts; there was a croft each at Knowes, Sannions, Sumra, Ocran, Ocraness, Quidadale, Westerhouse and Aurora (pronounced 'Rora). Additionally, Southerhouse, Northerhouse, and Easterhouse each had two crofts, making a total of 14.

References

Sources 

 
 
 
 
 

Northmavine
Landforms of Shetland
Headlands of Scotland
Sites of Special Scientific Interest in Shetland